The Aiguille de l'A Neuve is a mountain of the Mont Blanc massif, located on the border between Switzerland and France. It lies close to the Tour Noir to the south.

The closest locality is La Fouly (Valais).

References

External links
 Aiguille de l'A Neuve on Hikr

Mountains of the Alps
Alpine three-thousanders
Mountains of Valais
Mountains of Haute-Savoie
France–Switzerland border
International mountains of Europe
Mountains of Switzerland